Victor Schlatter is a former nuclear scientist, church planter, missionary, and author. He is the author of Where is the Body? and Showdown of the Gods.

Victor grew up in Portland, Oregon, was trained at Purdue, and eventually found himself working in a nuclear plant in Washington state. There he founded a church within the Apostolic Christian Church (Nazarean) denomination. In the late 1950s, Victor dedicated himself to a new vision, to reach the stone-age people of Papua New Guinea and translate the Bible into the Waola language. He and his wife Elsie spent 30 years in the country and produced an entire Bible and founded the Tiliba Christian Church now known as Good News Christian Church - PNG , which is currently composed of over one hundred and forty churches all over Papua New Guinea.

Schlatter now resides in Australia, where he still provides oversight and accountability to the Papua New Guinea churches and directs Southern Pacific Island Ministries, which is dedicated to promoting a relationship between southern pacific island Christians and Israel.

External links
Southern Pacific Island Ministries
A Bio of the Schlatters

Founders of new religious movements
Year of birth missing (living people)
Living people